Aleksander Velvelt (3 February 1897 Pihtla Parish, Kreis Ösel - 14 February 1967 Kohtla-Järve) was an Estonian politician. He was a member of Estonian Constituent Assembly. On 6 October 1919, he resigned his position and he was replaced by Hans Orav.

References

1897 births
1967 deaths
Estonian Labour Party politicians
Members of the Estonian Constituent Assembly
People from Saaremaa Parish
People from the Governorate of Livonia